Oak Hills is a census-designated place in the Victor Valley of the Mojave Desert, within San Bernardino County, California.

Geography
Oak Hills is in the Mojave Desert north of the Cajon Summit of Cajon Pass, southwest of Hesperia, and east of Phelan.

According to the United States Census Bureau, the CDP covers an area of 24.4 square miles (63.2 km), all of it land. The 2010 United States census reported Oak Hills's population was 8,879.

Education 
Oak Hills High School, overseen by the Hesperia Unified School District, is located in Oak Hills.

Demographics
At the 2010 census Oak Hills had a population of 8,879. In the 2013 Census Estimate, the racial makeup of Oak Hills was 76.5% White (61.7% Non-Hispanic White), 266 (3.0%) African American, 100 (1.1%) Native American, 226 (2.5%) Asian, 28 (0.3%) Pacific Islander, 1,166 (13.1%) from other races, and 297 (3.3%) from two or more races. Hispanic or Latino of any race were 2,719 persons (30.6%).

The whole population lived in households, no one lived in non-institutionalized group quarters and no one was institutionalized.

There were 2,976 households, out of which 1,191 (43.9%) had children under the age of 18 living in them, 1,948 (71.9%) were opposite-sex married couples living together, 217 (8.0%) had a female householder with no husband present, 128 (4.7%) had a male householder with no wife present.  There were 113 (4.2%) unmarried opposite-sex partnerships, and 19 (0.7%) same-sex married couples or partnerships. 322 households (11.9%) were one person and 107 (3.9%) had someone living alone who was 65 or older. The average household size was 3.28.  There were 2,293 families (84.6% of households); the average family size was 3.53.

The age distribution was 2,429 people (27.4%) under the age of 18, 809 people (9.1%) aged 18 to 24, 1,999 people (22.5%) aged 25 to 44, 2,789 people (31.4%) aged 45 to 64, and 853 people (9.6%) who were 65 or older.  The median age was 39.1 years. For every 100 females, there were 102.4 males.  For every 100 females age 18 and over, there were 99.4 males.

There were 2,976 housing units at an average density of 122.0 per square mile, of the occupied units 2,403 (88.7%) were owner-occupied and 307 (11.3%) were rented. The homeowner vacancy rate was 2.3%; the rental vacancy rate was 6.1%.  7,780 people (87.6% of the population) lived in owner-occupied housing units and 1,099 people (12.4%) lived in rental housing units.

According to the 2015 United States Census estimate, Oak Hills had a median household income of $69,260, with 9.3% of the population living below the federal poverty line.

See also

References

Census-designated places in San Bernardino County, California
Populated places in the Mojave Desert
Victor Valley
Census-designated places in California